Gayla Rienette Peevey (born March 8, 1943) is a former singer and child star from Oklahoma City, Oklahoma. She is best known for her recording of "I Want a Hippopotamus For Christmas" (Columbia 4-40106, 1953). Peevey recorded the novelty song when she was 10 years old.
In 1960, under the name Jamie Horton, she had a minor hit with the song "Robot Man", a Connie Francis cover.

Biography
Her family moved to Ponca City, Oklahoma, in 1948. Prior to moving to California Gayla attended Columbus Elementary School. Peevey graduated from San Diego State University with a Bachelor of Education degree. She eventually left teaching. She is married to Cliff Henderson. They have a daughter, Sydney Forest, and three grandchildren. Following her retirement from performing, Peevey runs her own jingle advertisement company and sings in church.

In popular culture
The Oklahoma City Zoo capitalized upon the popularity of "I Want A Hippopotamus For Christmas" with a fundraising campaign to "buy a hippo for Gayla". The fund raised $3,000 (equivalent to US$ in ), and a baby hippopotamus named Matilda was purchased and given to Peevey, which she then donated to the zoo in 1953. Matilda spent 45 years in the Oklahoma City Zoo, and then died at age 47 from a heart attack in 1998 while being transferred to the Walt Disney World's Disney's Animal Kingdom, in Orlando, Florida.

Singles (as Gayla Peevey) on Columbia Records

Singles (as Jamie Horton) on Joy Records (New York)

References

External links 

List of singles from Joy Records
 

1943 births
Living people
American child singers
American novelty song performers
Musicians from Oklahoma City
People from Ponca City, Oklahoma
Musicians from San Diego
San Diego State University alumni
20th-century American singers
20th-century American women singers
Singers from Oklahoma